Ankylosing spondylitis (AS) is a type of arthritis characterized by long-term inflammation of the joints of the spine typically where the spine joins the pelvis. Occasionally areas affected may include other joints such as the shoulders or hips. Eye and bowel problems may occur as well as back pain. Joint mobility in the affected areas generally worsens over time.

Although the cause of ankylosing spondylitis is unknown, it is believed to involve a combination of genetic and environmental factors. More than 85% of those affected in the UK have a specific human leukocyte antigen known as the HLA-B27 antigen. The underlying mechanism is believed to be autoimmune or autoinflammatory. Diagnosis is typically based on the symptoms with support from medical imaging and blood tests. AS is a type of seronegative spondyloarthropathy, meaning that tests show no presence of rheumatoid factor (RF) antibodies.

There is no known cure for AS. Treatments may include medication, exercise, physical therapy, and in rare cases surgery. Medications used include NSAIDs, steroids, DMARDs such as sulfasalazine, and biologic agents such as TNF inhibitors.

Approximately 0.1% to 0.8% of all humans are affected with onset typically occurring in young adults. Males and females are equally affected; however, women are more likely than men to experience inflammation rather than fusion.

Signs and symptoms

The signs and symptoms of ankylosing spondylitis often appear gradually, with peak onset between 20 and 30 years of age. Initial symptoms are usually a chronic dull pain in the lower back or gluteal region combined with stiffness of the lower back. Individuals often experience pain and stiffness that awakens them in the early morning hours.

As the disease progresses, loss of spinal mobility and chest expansion, with a limitation of anterior flexion, lateral flexion, and extension of the lumbar spine are seen. Systemic features are common with weight loss, fever, or fatigue often present. Pain is often severe at rest but may improve with physical activity. Inflammation and pain may recur to varying degrees regardless of rest and movement.

AS can occur in any part of the spine or the entire spine, often with pain localized to either buttock or the back of the thigh from the sacroiliac joint. Arthritis in the hips and shoulders may also occur. When the condition presents before the age of 18, AS is more likely to cause pain and swelling of large lower limb joints, such as the knees. In prepubescent cases, pain and swelling may also manifest in the ankles and feet where heel pain and enthesopathy commonly develop. Less common occurrences include ectasia of the sacral nerve root sheaths.

About 30% of people with AS will also experience anterior uveitis causing eye pain, redness, and blurred vision. This is thought to be due to the association that both AS and uveitis have with the presence of the HLA-B27 antigen. Cardiovascular involvement may include inflammation of the aorta, aortic valve insufficiency or disturbances of the heart's electrical conduction system. Lung involvement is characterized by progressive fibrosis of the upper portion of the lung.

Pathophysiology

Ankylosing spondylitis (AS) is a systemic rheumatic disease, meaning it affects the entire body. 1–2% of individuals with the HLA-B27 genotype develop the disease.  Tumor necrosis factor-alpha (TNF α) and Interleukin 1 (IL-1) are also implicated in ankylosing spondylitis. Autoantibodies specific for AS have not been identified. Anti-neutrophil cytoplasmic antibodies (ANCAs) are associated with AS, but do not correlate with disease severity.

Single nucleotide polymorphism (SNP) A/G variant rs10440635 is close to the PTGER4 gene on human chromosome 5 has been associated with an increased number of cases of AS in a population recruited from the United Kingdom, Australia, and Canada. The PTGER4 gene codes for the prostaglandin EP4 receptor (EP4), one of four receptors for prostaglandin E2. Activation of EP4 promotes bone remodeling and deposition (see EP4, bone) and EP4 is highly expressed at vertebral column sites involved in AS. These findings suggest that excessive EP4 activation contributes to pathological bone remodeling and deposition in AS and that the A/G variant rs10440635a of PTGER4 predisposes individuals to this disease, possibly by influencing EP4's production or expression pattern.

The association of AS with HLA-B27 suggests the condition involves CD8 T cells, which interact with HLA-B. This interaction is not proven to involve a self-antigen, and at least in the related reactive arthritis, which follows infections, the antigens involved are likely to be derived from intracellular microorganisms. There is, however, a possibility that CD4+ T lymphocytes are involved in an aberrant way, since HLA-B27 appears to have a number of unusual properties, including possibly an ability to interact with T cell receptors in association with CD4 (usually CD8+ cytotoxic T cell with HLAB antigen as it is a MHC class 1 antigen).

"Bamboo spine" develops when the outer fibers of the fibrous ring (anulus fibrosus disci intervertebralis) of the intervertebral discs ossify, which results in the formation of marginal syndesmophytes between adjoining vertebrae.

Diagnosis

Ankylosing spondylitis is a member of the more broadly defined disease axial spondyloarthritis. Axial spondyloarthritis can be divided into two categories: radiographic axial spondyloarthritis (which is a synonym for ankylosing spondylitis) and non-radiographic axial spondyloarthritis (which include less severe forms and early stages of ankylosing spondylitis).

While AS can be diagnosed through the description of radiological changes in the sacroiliac joints and spine, there are currently no direct tests (blood or imaging) to unambiguously diagnose early forms of ankylosing spondylitis (non-radiographic axial spondyloarthritis). Diagnosis of non-radiologic axial spondyloarthritis is therefore more difficult and is based on the presence of several typical disease features.

These diagnostic criteria include:
 Inflammatory back pain:Chronic, inflammatory back pain is defined when at least four out of five of the following parameters are present: (1) Age of onset below 40 years old, (2) insidious onset, (3) improvement with exercise, (4) no improvement with rest, and (5) pain at night (with improvement upon getting up)
 Past history of inflammation in the joints, heels, or tendon-bone attachments
 Family history for axial spondyloarthritis or other associated rheumatic/autoimmune conditions
 Positive for the biomarker HLA-B27
 Good response to treatment with nonsteroidal anti-inflammatory drugs (NSAIDs)
 Signs of elevated inflammation (C-reactive protein and erythrocyte sedimentation rate)
 Manifestation of psoriasis, inflammatory bowel disease, or inflammation of the eye (uveitis)

If these criteria still do not give a compelling diagnosis magnetic resonance imaging (MRI) may be useful. MRI can show inflammation of the sacroiliac joint.

Imaging

X-rays
The earliest changes demonstrable by plain X-ray shows erosions and sclerosis in sacroiliac joints. Progression of the erosions leads to widening of the joint space and bony sclerosis. X-ray spine can reveal squaring of vertebrae with bony spur formation called syndesmophyte. This causes the bamboo spine appearance. A drawback of X-ray diagnosis is the signs and symptoms of AS have usually been established as long as 7–10 years prior to X-ray-evident changes occurring on a plain film X-ray, which means a delay of as long as 10 years before adequate therapies can be introduced.

Options for earlier diagnosis are tomography and MRI of the sacroiliac joints, but the reliability of these tests is still unclear.

Blood parameters
During acute inflammatory periods, people with AS may show an increase in the blood concentration of CRP and an increase in the ESR, but there are many with AS whose CRP and ESR rates do not increase, so normal CRP and ESR results do not always correspond with the amount of inflammation that is actually present. In other words, some people with AS have normal levels of CRP and ESR, despite experiencing a significant amount of inflammation in their bodies.

Genetic testing
Variations of the HLA-B gene increase the risk of developing ankylosing spondylitis, although it is not a diagnostic test. Those with the HLA-B27 variant are at a higher risk than the general population of developing the disorder. HLA-B27, demonstrated in a blood test, can occasionally help with diagnosis, but in itself is not diagnostic of AS in a person with back pain. Over 85% of people that have been diagnosed with AS are HLA-B27 positive, although this ratio varies from population to population (about 50% of African Americans with AS possess HLA-B27 in contrast to the figure of 80% among those with AS who are of Mediterranean descent).

BASDAI
The Bath Ankylosing Spondylitis Disease Activity Index (BASDAI), developed in Bath (UK), is an index designed to detect the inflammatory burden of active disease. The BASDAI can help to establish a diagnosis of AS in the presence of other factors such as HLA-B27 positivity, persistent buttock pain which resolves with exercise, and X-ray or MRI-evident involvement of the sacroiliac joints. It can be easily calculated and accurately assesses the need for additional therapy; a person with AS with a score of four out of a possible 10 points while on adequate NSAID therapy is usually considered a good candidate for biologic therapy.

The Bath Ankylosing Spondylitis Functional Index (BASFI) is a functional index which can accurately assess functional impairment due to the disease, as well as improvements following therapy. The BASFI is not usually used as a diagnostic tool, but rather as a tool to establish a current baseline and subsequent response to therapy.

Children 
Juvenile ankylosing spondylitis (JAS) is a rare form of the disease which differs from the more common adult form. Enthesophathy and arthritis of large joints of the lower extremities is more common than the characteristic early-morning back pain seen in adult AS. Ankylosing tarsitis of the ankle is a common feature, as is the more classical findings of seronegative ANA and RF as well as presence of the HLA-B27 allele. Primary engagement of the appendicular joints may explain delayed diagnosis; however, other common symptoms of AS such as uveitis, diarrhea, pulmonary disease and heart valve disease may lead suspicion away from other juvenile spondyloarthropathies.

Schober's test
The Schober's test is a useful clinical measure of flexion of the lumbar spine performed during the physical examination.

Treatment
There is no cure for AS, although treatments and medications can reduce symptoms and pain.

Medication
The major types of medications used to treat ankylosing spondylitis are pain-relievers and drugs aimed at stopping or slowing the progression of the disease. All of these have potentially serious side effects. Pain-relieving drugs come in two major classes:
 The mainstay of therapy in all seronegative spondyloarthropathies are anti-inflammatory drugs, which include NSAIDs such as ibuprofen, phenylbutazone, diclofenac, indomethacin, naproxen and COX-2 inhibitors, which reduce inflammation and pain. 2012 research showed that those with AS and elevated levels of acute phase reactants seem to benefit most from continuous treatment with NSAIDs.

Medications used to treat the progression of the disease include the following:
 Disease-modifying antirheumatic drugs (DMARDs) such as sulfasalazine can be used in people with peripheral arthritis. For axial involvement, evidence does not support sulfasalazine. Other DMARDS, such as methotrexate, did not have enough evidence to prove their effect. Generally, systemic corticosteroids were not used due to lack of evidence. Local injection with corticosteroid can be used for certain people with peripheral arthritis.
 Tumor necrosis factor-alpha (TNFα) blockers (antagonists), such as the biologics etanercept, infliximab, golimumab and adalimumab, have shown good short-term effectiveness in the form of profound and sustained reduction in all clinical and laboratory measures of disease activity. Trials are ongoing to determine their long-term effectiveness and safety. The major drawback is the cost. An alternative may be the newer, orally-administered non-biologic apremilast, which inhibits TNF-α secretion, but a recent study did not find the drug useful for ankylosing spondylitis.
 Anti-interleukin-6 inhibitors such as tocilizumab, currently approved for the treatment of rheumatoid arthritis, and rituximab, a monoclonal antibody against CD20, are also undergoing trials.
 Interleukin-17A inhibitors secukinumab and ixekizumab are options for the treatment of active ankylosing spondylitis in patients that have responded inadequately to (TNFα) blockers.
 Janus kinase inhibitor tofacitinib is approved for the treatment of active ankylosing spondylitis in adult patients that show an inadequate response to prior DMARD therapy.

Surgery
In severe cases of AS, surgery can be an option in the form of joint replacements, particularly in the knees and hips. Surgical correction is also possible for those with severe flexion deformities (severe downward curvature) of the spine, particularly in the neck, although this procedure is considered very risky.
In addition, AS can have some manifestations which make anesthesia more complex. Changes in the upper airway can lead to difficulties in intubating the airway, spinal and epidural anesthesia may be difficult owing to calcification of ligaments, and a small number of people have aortic insufficiency. The stiffness of the thoracic ribs results in ventilation being mainly diaphragm-driven, so there may also be a decrease in pulmonary function.

Physical therapy
Though physical therapy remedies have been scarcely documented, some therapeutic exercises are used to help manage lower back, neck, knee, and shoulder pain. There is moderate quality evidence that therapeutic exercise programmes help reduce pain and improve function. Some therapeutic exercises include:
 Exercise programs, either at home or supervised
 Low intensity aerobic exercise, e.g. Pilates
 Spa-exercise therapy
 Aquatic physical therapy
 Proprioceptive neuromuscular facilitation (PNF)
 Heat therapy
 Cryotherapy in conjunction with exercise

Moderate-to-high impact exercises like jogging are generally not recommended or recommended with restrictions due to the jarring of affected vertebrae that can worsen pain and stiffness in some with AS.

Diet
Research by Alan Ebringer at King's College in London, beginning in the 1980s, has implicated overgrowth of the bacterium Klebsiella pneumoniae in the symptoms of ankylosing spondylitis. The body produces antibodies that attack Klebsiella pneumoniae. Enzymes made by the bacterium resemble human proteins, including three types of collagen (I, III, IV) and the HLA-B27 complex of glycoproteins. The antibodies therefore attack these human proteins, producing the symptoms of ankylosing spondylitis. Ebringer and others recommend low-starch or no-starch diets. 

The site kickAS.org, referencing the work of Ebringer and others, created a "No Starch Diet" guide.

Prognosis

Prognosis is related to disease severity. AS can range from mild to progressively debilitating and from medically controlled to refractory. Some cases may have times of active inflammation followed by times of remission resulting in minimal disability while others never have times of remission and have acute inflammation and pain, leading to significant disability. As the disease progresses, it can cause the vertebrae and the lumbosacral joint to ossify, resulting in the fusion of the spine. This places the spine in a vulnerable state because it becomes one bone, which causes it to lose its range of motion as well as putting it at risk for spinal fractures. This not only limits mobility but reduces the affected person's quality of life. Complete fusion of the spine can lead to a reduced range of motion and increased pain, as well as total joint destruction which could lead to a joint replacement.

Osteoporosis is common in ankylosing spondylitis, both from chronic systemic inflammation and decreased mobility resulting from AS. Over a long-term period, osteopenia or osteoporosis of the AP spine may occur, causing eventual compression fractures and a back "hump". Hyperkyphosis from ankylosing spondylitis can also lead to impairment in mobility and balance, as well as impaired peripheral vision, which increases the risk of falls which can cause fracture of already-fragile vertebrae. Typical signs of progressed AS are the visible formation of syndesmophytes on X-rays and abnormal bone outgrowths similar to osteophytes affecting the spine. In compression fractures of the vertebrae, paresthesia is a complication due to the inflammation of the tissue surrounding nerves.

Organs commonly affected by AS, other than the axial spine and other joints, are the heart, lungs, eyes, colon, and kidneys. Other complications are aortic regurgitation, Achilles tendinitis, AV node block, and amyloidosis. Owing to lung fibrosis, chest X-rays may show apical fibrosis, while pulmonary function testing may reveal a restrictive lung defect. Very rare complications involve neurologic conditions such as the cauda equina syndrome.

Mortality
Mortality is increased in people with AS and circulatory disease is the most frequent cause of death. People with AS have an increased risk of 60% for cerebrovascular mortality, and an overall increased risk of 50% for vascular mortality. About one third of those with ankylosing spondylitis have severe disease, which reduces life expectancy.

As increased mortality in ankylosing spondylitis is related to disease severity, factors negatively affecting outcomes include:
 Male sex 
 Plus three of the following in the first two years of disease:
 Erythrocyte sedimentation rate (ESR) >30 mm/h
 Unresponsive to NSAIDs
 Limitation of lumbar spine range of motion
 Sausage-like fingers or toes
 Oligoarthritis
 Onset <16 years old

Gait
The hunched position that often results from complete spinal fusion can have an effect on a person's gait. Increased spinal kyphosis will lead to a forward and downward shift in center of mass (COM). This shift in COM has been shown to be compensated by increased knee flexion and ankle dorsiflexion. The gait of someone with ankylosing spondylitis often has a cautious pattern because they have decreased ability to absorb shock, and they cannot see the horizon.

Epidemiology
Between 0.1% and 0.8% of people are affected. The disease is most common in Northern European countries, and seen least in people of Afro-Caribbean descent. Although the ratio of male to female disease is reportedly 3:1, many rheumatologists believe the number of women with AS is underdiagnosed, as most women tend to experience milder cases of the disease. The majority of people with AS, including 95 percent of people of European descent with the disease, express the HLA-B27 antigen and high levels of immunoglobulin A (IgA) in the blood. In 2007, a team of researchers discovered two genes that may contribute to the cause of AS: ARTS-1 and IL23R. Together with HLA-B27, these two genes account for roughly 70 percent of the overall number of cases of the disease.

History

Ankylosing spondylitis has a long history, having been distinguished from rheumatoid arthritis by Galen as early as the 2nd century AD. Skeletal evidence of the disease (ossification of joints and entheses primarily of the axial skeleton, known as "bamboo spine") was thought to be found in the skeletal remains of a 5000-year-old Egyptian mummy with evidence of bamboo spine.  However, a subsequent report found that this was not the case.

The anatomist and surgeon Realdo Colombo described what could have been the disease in 1559, and the first account of pathologic changes to a skeleton possibly associated with AS was published in 1691 by Bernard Connor. In 1818, Benjamin Brodie became the first physician to document a person believed to have active AS who also had accompanying iritis.

In 1858, David Tucker published a small booklet which clearly described the case of Leonard Trask, who had severe spinal deformity subsequent to AS. In 1833, Trask fell from a horse, exacerbating the condition and resulting in severe deformity. Tucker reported:

The account of Trask became the first documented case of AS in the United States, owing to its indisputable description of inflammatory disease characteristics of AS and the hallmark of deforming injury in AS.

In the late nineteenth century, the neurophysiologist Vladimir Bekhterev of Russia in 1893, Adolph Strümpell of Germany in 1897, and Pierre Marie of France in 1898 were the first to give adequate descriptions which permitted an accurate diagnosis of AS prior to severe spinal deformity. For this reason, AS is also known as Bekhterev disease, Bechterew's disease or Marie–Strümpell disease.

The word is from Greek ankylos meaning crooked, curved or rounded, spondylos meaning vertebra, and -itis meaning inflammation.

References

External links 
 
 Questions and Answers about Ankylosing Spondylitis - US National Institute of Arthritis and Musculoskeletal and Skin Diseases

 
Arthritis
Autoimmune diseases
Rheumatology
Wikipedia neurology articles ready to translate
Wikipedia medicine articles ready to translate